Roy Alon (24 April 1942 – 1 February 2006) was a British stuntman.

Born in Otley, West Riding of Yorkshire, during his 36-year career he appeared in over 1,000 films including the James Bond and Superman films. His debut came in A Bridge Too Far.

Roy made the Guinness Book of Records for being the world's most prolific stuntman. He doubled for actors as varied as Peter Sellers and Sophia Loren.

Filmography

Film

References

External links

1942 births
2006 deaths
English stunt performers
People from Otley
British people of Jewish descent